Gari Babakhan (also Romanized as Garī Bābākhān, Gorī Bābā Khān, and Gūrī Bābā Khān; also known as Shohadā) is a village in Jelogir Rural District, in the Central District of Pol-e Dokhtar County, Lorestan Province, Iran. At the 2006 census, its population was 249, in 60 families.

References 

Towns and villages in Pol-e Dokhtar County